Hockey Club Frýdek-Místek is a professional ice hockey club from Frýdek-Místek, Czech Republic. It was founded in 1976.

History
It was founded in 1976 as a successor to multi-sports club TJ Válcovna Plechu.  Since 1991, with the exception of five years (2004–2009), when the club sold the license to Salith Šumperk, they have been a regular participant in the 2nd division. Since the 2015/16 season, the club entered in a partnership with HC Oceláři Třinec. In the 2015/16 season, the club managed to advance to the 1st division.

Naming history
1976 – TJ VP Frýdek-Místek (Tělovýchovná jednota Válcovny Plechu Frýdek-Místek)
1977 – TJ Slezan Frýdek-Místek (Tělovýchovná jednota Slezan Frýdek-Místek)
1990 – HC Slezan Frýdek-Místek (Hockey Club Slezan Frýdek-Místek)
1997 – HC Frýdek-Místek (Hockey Club Frýdek-Místek)

References

External links
 HC Frýdek Místek profile at hokej.cz 

Frydek
1976 establishments in Czechoslovakia
Ice hockey clubs established in 1976
Sport in Frýdek-Místek